The Memorial Arch is a historic memorial arch located in Memorial Park at Huntington, Cabell County, West Virginia. It was built between 1924 and 1929 by the Cabell County War Memorial Association as a memorial to the dead and to those who served the county in World War I.  It is built of gray Indiana limestone on a gray granite base. It measures 42 feet high, 34 feet wide, and 9 feet deep.  It features Classical Revival style bas-relief carvings. The structure was rededicated in 1980. It is the only triumphal style arch in West Virginia.

It was listed on the National Register of Historic Places in 1981.

References

World War I memorials in the United States
Neoclassical architecture in West Virginia
Buildings and structures completed in 1924
Buildings and structures in Huntington, West Virginia
Triumphal arches in the United States
National Register of Historic Places in Cabell County, West Virginia
Monuments and memorials on the National Register of Historic Places in West Virginia
1924 sculptures
1924 establishments in West Virginia
Stone sculptures in West Virginia
Limestone sculptures in the United States
Granite sculptures in West Virginia
Parks on the National Register of Historic Places in West Virginia
Municipal parks in West Virginia